Since 2004, NASCAR's top three racing series have closed their season with a weekend designed to crown each series' champion, officially known as NASCAR Championship Weekend.

From 2004 until 2019, the final race weekend of the season was run at Homestead-Miami Speedway in Homestead, Florida. Ford Motor Company became the title sponsor for all three races, and the weekend became known as Ford Championship Weekend. During the most recent round of ongoing schedule adjustments in NASCAR, the championship weekend races were moved
in 2020 to Phoenix Raceway in Avondale, Arizona.

With the removal of Homestead from the final race weekend, some drivers have stated that the championship races should rotate between tracks every year instead of being held at one particular facility, similar to the Super Bowl.

History

NASCAR first decided to conclude its respective seasons on the same weekend at the same track in 2002. Prior to that, all three series finished at different tracks. The then-Craftsman Truck Series' final event was at Phoenix for the previous several years and had always been held in the western United States. The then-Busch Series' final event had been held at Homestead-Miami Speedway since 1995 (in fact, the 1995 race was the first major race ever conducted at what was then Homestead Motorsports Complex). The then-Winston Cup Series had held its final race at Atlanta Motor Speedway from 1987 onward with one notable exception; the 2001 race actually served as the penultimate event due to the 9/11-related rescheduling of the fall race at New Hampshire International Speedway.

It was decided to hold the championship races at the Homestead facility in Florida, which had been on all three series' schedules since 1999 once the track received its Cup Series event. As mentioned previously, the events were held there until the end of the 2019 NASCAR season when the decision was made to move them to Arizona.

After each race, an official ceremony is conducted in victory lane where the final points leader in each series is given his championship trophy.

In 2016, NASCAR adopted a championship format that is similar in function to one used by the NHRA Mello Yello Drag Racing Series to determine their Champions. Over the course of the final races of the season, qualifying drivers are eliminated from championship contention if they are not above a certain threshold following a specific event. Once the field for each series is reduced to four contenders, the Championship Weekend races are then run with the highest finishing driver among the four in each series being crowned champion.

Pre-playoff history
It was previously possible for a driver to clinch the championship before he even reached the final weekend. This happened a total of nine times, with each series having it occur at least once. The Xfinity Series saw it happen the most, on six occasions. The Truck Series saw it happen twice, while the Cup Series did so only once. When this happened, the champion would be presented with his trophy in an informal postrace ceremony with the official crowning happening following the final race.

In the pre-playoff era, there were a total of four occasions where a series points leader entering the race did not end it as champion. The first two occurrences happened during the Ford 200 Truck Series race. In 2003, Brendan Gaughan crashed out of the event late, finished 29th, and fell from first to fourth in the standings while Travis Kvapil won the championship. In 2007, Ron Hornaday Jr. and Mike Skinner were separated by 29 points going into the race, but points leader Skinner had a problem with one of his truck's tires and axles and finished 35th. Hornaday finished seventh and won the title by 54 points. In 2010, 46 points separated first place Denny Hamlin, second place Jimmie Johnson, and third place Kevin Harvick in the Sprint Cup standings. At various times in the Ford 400 each driver held the points lead, but in the end Johnson clinched his fifth consecutive Sprint Cup championship by finishing second in the race. Hamlin fell to second place, 39 points behind Johnson, with his 14th-place finish. Harvick finished 3rd in both the race and the points, 41 points behind Johnson. In 2011, Tony Stewart entered the race three points behind Carl Edwards for the Sprint Cup lead. Stewart won the Ford 400 with Edwards finishing second and the points race ended in a tie. However, due to Stewart holding more victories than Edwards over the course of the season (Stewart's win gave him five while Edwards only won once), Stewart won the tiebreaker and became series champion for a third time.

Multiple event winners
Several drivers have won more than one race held during this weekend. Todd Bodine, Greg Biffle, Kyle Busch, Carl Edwards, and Matt Kenseth are the only drivers to win the same event more than once, while Busch and Edwards are the only two drivers to win multiple races in the same weekend. Bodine won the Truck race in 2005 and 2008, while Busch won the Nationwide races in 2009 and 2010. Biffle won the Cup race in 2004, 2005, and 2006, Edwards won in 2008 and 2010, and Kenseth won the Ford 300 in 2006 and 2014 and the Ford 400 in 2007. Edwards won the Ford 300 and Ford 400 in 2008 and Busch won the Ford 200 and 300 in 2010. In his two wins Busch accomplished a rare feat in that he clinched multiple owners' championships with his wins. His victory in the Ford 200 won Busch the Truck Series owners' championship for his own team, Kyle Busch Motorsports, while his 13th victory of the season in the #18 Joe Gibbs Racing Nationwide Series car clinched the series' owners' championship for JGR. (Busch did not win the drivers' championship, as he had not run the full schedule and it had been clinched before the Ford 300 even if he had, but despite only running 28 races his 13 wins helped propel him to a third-place finish in the final standings. Busch was one of three drivers that season who finished in the top ten without running a full schedule; his teammate Joey Logano finished eighth while only running 25 races and Kevin Harvick finished sixth with only 28 races under his belt. Further, this was the last year that NASCAR allowed drivers to earn points in multiple series as a rule was implemented for 2011 in which a driver had to declare which series he would race in for points, although he could continue to run in other series and accumulate owner points for his team.)

Besides the drivers listed above, several others have won more than one event in the Ford Championship Weekend during their racing careers. Kasey Kahne won the 2003 Ford 300 and the 2004 Ford 200, Jeff Gordon won the Busch race in 2000 and the Cup race in 2012; however, back in 2000, only the Cup and Busch Series raced that weekend and it wasn't the final races of the season for the two series. Kevin Harvick and Kyle Busch are the only drivers to win all three Ford Championship Weekend events in their racing careers. Harvick won the Ford 300 in 2004, the Ford 200 in 2009, and the Ford EcoBoost 400 in 2014. Kyle Busch won the Ford 200 in 2010 and 2013, the Ford 300 twice in 2009 and 2010, and the Ford EcoBoost 400 in 2015.

Television and radio coverage

Current
Since the championship weekend festivities fall during the second half of the NASCAR season, the Xfinity and Cup Series races are carried by the television entity that is contracted to air that portion of the season. As of 2015, the rights are held by NBC Sports. The exception is the Truck Series race, as Fox Sports owns the exclusive rights to all Truck Series events. The Truck races air on Fox Sports 1, the successor to its former home Speed Channel, while the Xfinity and Cup races air on either NBC or NBCSN. The Xfinity race was on NBC in 2015 and on NBCSN all other years; the Cup race has been on NBC since 2015.

All championship races are carried over radio by Motor Racing Network.

Previous
When Championship Weekend began, the Truck Series race was carried by ESPN2 as ESPN retained the rights to the series after losing its NASCAR broadcast rights following the 2000 season. Speed Channel took over all rights beginning in 2003; the network became Fox Sports 1 in August 2013.

Since NBC was already contracted to air the Busch and Cup races at Homestead once it acquired rights to the latter race, they continued to carry the races in conjunction with TNT, their broadcast partner. The networks shared coverage of the Busch race (NBC from 2002 to 2004, TNT in 2005 and 2006) while NBC aired the Cup race.

In 2007, ESPN returned to covering NASCAR and began carrying their championship weekend events over ESPN, ABC, and ESPN2. The ESPN family of networks actually had two separate contracts with NASCAR at the time; the Busch/Nationwide race aired on ESPN2 as ESPN was the exclusive television rights holder for the series under their contract. The Cup series race was carried by ABC until 2009 and ESPN until the contract ended in 2014 as part of ESPN's rights to the second half of the Cup season.

Race results
As noted above, final races were run at Homestead-Miami Speedway from 2002 until 2019 and at Phoenix Raceway from 2020.

Truck Series

Playoff era
Highest finishing driver among four eligible for championship wins series championship.

Busch/Nationwide/Xfinity Series

Playoff era
Highest finishing driver among eligible drivers for championship wins series championship.

Cup Series

Championship Round era
Highest finishing driver among four eligible for championship wins series championship.

References

 
Ford Motor Company
November sporting events
2002 establishments in Florida
Recurring sporting events established in 2002